Abdul Zahir is the Minister of Education for Konar Province, Afghanistan.

References

Afghan politicians
People from Kunar Province
Living people
Pashtun people
Year of birth missing (living people)
Place of birth missing (living people)